Rear Admiral Iain Robert Henderson,  (born 1 April 1948) is a retired senior Royal Navy officer.

Early life and education
Henderson was born on 1 April 1948. He was educated at Epsom College, then an all-boys private school. He entered the Britannia Royal Naval College in 1965.

Naval career
Henderson joined the Royal Navy and trained as a helicopter and fast jet pilot, including a secondment to the RAF where he flew McDonnell Douglas Phantom interceptors out of RAF Leuchars. He became second-in-command of the frigate  and saw action during the Falklands War. He went on to be commanding officer of the frigate , the frigate  and the frigate . In HMS London he saw action during the Gulf War. He went on to command RNAS Yeovilton and HMNB Portsmouth.

Henderson became Flag Officer, Naval Air Command in 1998 before retiring in 2001.

Later life
After his retirement from the navy, Henderson joined the third sector. From 2001 to 2007, he served as Chief Executive of Sue Ryder Care, a British social care charity. From 2002 to 2006, he was Gentleman Usher of the Scarlet Rod. His final duty as Gentleman Usher of the Scarlet Rod occurred in May 2006, during that year's Installation of Knights. In June 2006, he was appointed Registrar and Secretary of the Order of the Bath.

In 2006, Henderson was appointed Deputy Lieutenant of Hampshire. He has served as Vice Lord-Lieutenant of Hampshire since 2018.

References

 

 
 
 

Commanders of the Order of the British Empire
Companions of the Order of the Bath
Deputy Lieutenants of Hampshire
Gentlemen Ushers
Living people
Royal Navy rear admirals
Royal Navy personnel of the Falklands War
Royal Navy personnel of the Gulf War
1948 births
People educated at Epsom College
Graduates of Britannia Royal Naval College